Beinwil may refer to:

in Switzerland:
 Beinwil (Freiamt) in the canton of Aargau
 Beinwil am See in the canton of Aargau
 Beinwil, Solothurn, location of the Beinwil Abbey